McGee v. The Attorney General [1973] IR 284 was a judgment of the Irish Supreme Court in 1973 on marital privacy. By a decision of 4 to 1, the court conferred upon spouses a broad right to privacy in marital affairs.

Background 
Mary McGee was a 27-year-old mother of four, including twins, at the time of the case. McGee's second and third pregnancies were complicated by severe cerebral thrombosis. Also during her pregnancies she suffered from a stroke and temporary paralysis. Her condition was such that she was advised by her physician that if she would become pregnant again her life would be endangered. She was then instructed to use a diaphragm and spermicidal jelly that was prescribed to her. However, section 17 of the Criminal Law Amendment Act 1935 prohibited the importation of these devices.

Ruling 
The Supreme Court ruled by a 4 to 1 majority in favor of Mary McGee, after determining that married couples have the constitutional right to make private decisions on family planning.

References

Constitution of Ireland
Irish constitutional law
1974 in Ireland
1974 in case law